Nenad Radonjić (born 19 March 1996) is a Serbian football forward who plays for OFK Bačka.

References

External links
 
 Nenad Radonjić stats at utakmica.rs 
 

1996 births
Living people
Footballers from Belgrade
Association football forwards
Serbian footballers
FK Voždovac players
FK Radnički Beograd players
FK Kolubara players
FK Radnički 1923 players
FK Radnički Sremska Mitrovica players
OFK Žarkovo players
OFK Bačka players
Serbian SuperLiga players
Serbian First League players